Aluminium phenolate is the metalloorganic compound with the formula [Al(OC6H5)3]n.   It is a white solid. 27Al NMR studies suggest that aluminium phenolate exists in benzene solution as a mixture of dimer and trimer.  The compound is can be prepared by the reaction of elemental aluminium with phenol:
Al  +  3 HOC6H5  →  Al(OC6H5)3  +  1.5 H2
The compound is used as a catalyst for the alkylation of phenols with various alkenes.  For example, the ethylphenols are generated commercially by treating phenol with ethylene in the presence of a catalytic amount of aluminium phenolate.

Related compounds
 Aluminium isopropoxide

References

Phenolates
Aluminium compounds